Biker culture may refer to various aspects of motorcycling and relevant subculture, specifically that of:

 Motorcycle clubs, groups of individuals whose primary interest and activities involve motorcycles
 Outlaw motorcycle clubs, also called one percenter clubs or motorcycle gangs

See also
Bicycle culture
:Category:Motorcycling subculture